Red Sky is a studio album by English singer-songwriter Ralph McTell, released in 2000 by Leola Music.

Critical reception

Upon its release, Rob Beattie of Q described Red Sky as "an album far more substantial than could have been expected". He added: "At 75 minutes there are still a few horrors, but there's also plenty of the fine, observational balladry for which he made his name. The result is McTell's best record for 25 years." In 2005, Helen Wright of musicOMH considered Red Sky "a lovely album for quiet listening". She wrote: "The tracks on Red Sky span a wider spectrum than the very English folk-rock sound that marked his early career, but the songs reflecting that heritage are the most successful. The excursions into other styles are sometimes triumphant, sometimes best not mentioned."

Track listing

References

2000 albums
Ralph McTell albums